A Labradoodle is a crossbreed dog created by crossing a Labrador Retriever and a Standard, Miniature, or Toy Poodle. The term dates back to at least 1955  but was unpopular at the time. Labradoodles are considered a good choice for people with canine dander allergies, since some have the same hypoallergenic coat as their poodle ancestors.

The Australian Labradoodle Association, an organization run by Labradoodle breeders, says they are "generally considered healthy dogs". However, they also state that hip and elbow dysplasia are common problems affecting Labradoodles. Other ailments include eye diseases and Addison's disease. Wally Conron of Australia asserts that healthy Labradoodles are "few and far between" and most are "crazy or have a hereditary problem." He mistakenly took credit for naming the Labradoodle in 1989. 

The Labradoodle mix had been known in the United States since the 1950s and was used in the entertainment industry in the U.S. as early as the 1960s. For example, a Labrador-Poodle mix named Fang had a recurring role on the Get Smart show starting in 1965. At the same time (in the 1950s) the Cockapoo (a mix of Cocker Spaniel and Poodle) had a rise in popularity.

Breeding history

Origins
The term "Labradoodle" was first used by Donald Campbell to describe his dog, a Labrador/Poodle cross (1955). However, the use of a Labradoodle as a guide/service dog was not common until 1989. Australian breeder Wally Conron introduced the cross-breed to the Royal Guide Dog Association of Australia in Victoria. Conron hoped that the combination of the low-shedding coat of the poodle, along with the gentleness and trainability of a Labrador retriever, would provide a guide dog suitable for people with allergies to fur and dander.

Sultan, a dog from this litter, displayed all the qualities Conron was seeking and worked as a guide dog for a woman in Hawaii for ten years.

Conron has since repeatedly stated he regrets initiating the fashion for this type of crossbreed and maintains it caused "a lot of damage" together with "a lot of problems", largely stemming from the genetic unpredictability of combining breeds. He also felt he was to blame for "creating a Frankenstein", adding that problems were being bred into the dogs rather than selectively breeding away from problems and towards a recognizable standard. He is further quoted as claiming: "For every perfect one, you're going to find a lot of crazy ones." Mr. Conron was referring to the craze he initiated of unscrupulous breeders crossing Poodles with multiple other breeds to create "designer" dogs in order to take advantage of the “doodle” trend.

Follow-on guide-dog breeding programs

Currently, as with other mixed breeds, Labradoodles are not considered a purebred or breed by the AKC and other major kennel club associations in North America. Technically, they are a hybrid of two pure breeds rather than a new breed. However, in 2010 they began allowing owners of mixed breeds to register their dogs to receive an AKC ID number.  There are other reputable organizations breeders can join if they qualify and follow the breed standard, regulations and ethical requirements. ALAA, ALCA and the Worldwide Australian Labradoodle Association (WALA) are the three major organizations for Australian Labradoodles.

Guide Dogs Victoria no longer breeds Labradoodles, however, they are bred by other guide and assistance dog organizations in Australia and elsewhere. The Association for the Blind of Western Australia has introduced Labradoodles into their training program. Their first, Jonnie, graduated in November 2010. Labradoodles are now widely used around the world as guide, assistance, and therapy dogs. They are also popular family dogs.

Emerging breed standard and family dogs
Labradoodles are crossbreeds of a poodle and a Labrador retriever. Breeders in Australia have gone on to develop the Australian Labradoodle which also includes spaniels in the mix for early generations of the breed. "Multigeneration Australian Labradoodles" are dogs who have been bred only to other multigeneration Australian Labradoodles for a minimum of four generations.

These dogs have a breed standard and consistent looks and temperament. They are also low shedding and may result in less extreme allergic reactions due to their allergy friendly coat. Australian Labradoodles come in standard (large), medium, and mini size. 

The Norwegian crown prince and princess own labradoodles.

Appearance and temperament

Because the (generic) Labradoodle is a cross between two dog breeds and not a breed itself, puppies in the early hybrid generations do not have consistently predictable characteristics. The first crossing of a poodle with a Labrador does result in variations in terms of appearance, size, coat and temperament. So while most Labradoodles share some common traits, their appearance and behavioral characteristics can be widely variable.

Labradoodles' hair can be anywhere from wiry to soft, and may be straight, wavy, or curly. Some Labradoodles do shed, although the coat usually sheds less and has less "dog odor" than that of a Labrador retriever. Regular haircuts, bathing and brushing are necessary to maintaining a healthy coat.

Labradoodles often display an affinity for water and strong swimming ability from their parent breeds. Like most Labrador retrievers and poodles, Labradoodles are generally friendly, energetic, and good with families and children. Their parent breeds are both among the world's most intelligent dog breeds, in which the poodle is believed to be among the smartest (second, after the border collie).

Types

Undesirable coats 
Some Labradoodles are born with what is deemed an undesirable coat. These coats generally appear with the Labradoodle having a flat coat without the curls the dogs are known for. A Labradoodle with an undesirable coat may look more like its Labrador retriever mother or father with a longer nose. These dogs may also have curly fur around the legs and tail.

Breeding line issues
There is no consensus as to whether breeders should aim to have Labradoodles recognized as a breed. Some breeders prefer to restrict breeding to produce F1 hybrids (bred from a poodle and Labrador rather than, e.g. F2 hybrids bred from two Labradoodles) to ensure relatively uniform genetics among the Labradoodles, while maximizing genetic diversity of individual dogs to avoid inherited health problems that have plagued some inbred dog breeds.

A large number of Labradoodle and Australian Labradoodle breeders who well regarded, were previously breeders of purebred dogs . For many of these breeders, the inherent concerns with health and temperament for dogs who are being produced through repeated and more closely inbreeding and line-breeding led them to the Labradoodle or Australian Labradoodle. The WALA and ALAA maintain open stud books whereas the ALCA maintains a closed stud book.

Others are breeding Labradoodle to Labradoodle over successive generations, and trying to establish a new dog breed. These dogs are usually referred to as multigenerational (multigen) Labradoodles or multigeneration Australian Labradoodles.

Australian Labradoodle breeding program
Australian Labradoodles also differ from Labradoodles in general, in that they may also have other breeds in their ancestry. English and American cocker spaniel × poodle crosses (i.e. cockapoos). Two Irish water spaniels and soft-coated Wheaten terriers were used in some Australian Labradoodle lines. Curly coated retriever were used too, but these lines were unsatisfactory and are no longer used for breeding.

Currently, Australian Labradoodle breeding lines may only have 3 breeds infused: poodles, Labrador retrievers, and spaniels. Infusions occur with early generation breedings. Multigeneration breedings do not use any breed other than Australian Labradoodle to Australian Labradoodle. Australian Labradoodles also generally have poodles and Labradors in their pedigrees that come from European lines, whereas other Labradoodle lines tend to rely heavily on American stock. Thus the frequent misnomer of "American" Labradoodle when referring generically to a Labradoodle.

Coat texture and color
Labradoodle coats are divided into three categories: wool, fleece, or hair. Australian Labradoodles predominantly have fleece coats that are straight or wavy only. Wool and hair coats do not apply other than to early generation Labradoodles.

Labradoodles' coat colors include chocolate, cafe, parchment, cream, gold, apricot, red, black, silver, chalk, lavender, and blue -ish gray. Coat patterns can be solid, white abstract markings, parti, phantom, or tri-coloured. In general, Labradoodles may have any coat-color a poodle can have. There are three main types of the coat texture of a Labradoodle. This can be a hair, fleece, or wool.

Size

Labradoodles can be different sizes, depending on the size of sire and dam used, and their size-names generally follow the names used for poodles: miniature, medium, and standard.

Health
Labradoodles can have problems common to their parent breeds. Poodles and Labrador retrievers can have hip dysplasia, and should have specialist radiography to check for this problem before breeding. The parent breeds can also have a number of eye disorders, and an examination by a qualified veterinary eye specialist should be performed on breeding dogs. There have also been cases of neurological disorders, including epilepsy.

Joint dysplasia
Elbow dysplasia is a known common issue in the parent breeds, similar to hip dysplasia. This issue becomes more prevalent as a result of rapid growth during the puppy stage. Appropriate screening should be completed for this condition prior to breeding.

Congenital eye diseases
Labradoodles have been known to be susceptible to progressive retinal atrophy (PRA), an inherited disease causing blindness, which occurs in both miniature poodles and cocker spaniels. It is recommended that Australian Labradoodles be DNA-tested for PRA before being bred.

One study has found that UK Labradoodles have a higher incidence (4.6%) of multifocal retinal dysplasia (MRA) compared to Labrador retrievers. Cataract is common as well (3.7%) but prevalence is comparable to that of Labradors.

Addison's disease
There is evidence of some occurrence of Addison's disease in the Australian Labradoodle.

Ear Infections
Labradoodles are very prone to ear infections due to their long floppy ears.

See also
Goldendoodle
Cockapoo

Footnotes

References

Further reading

External links

 

 
 

Companion dogs
Dog crossbreeds